The 12225 / 12226 Kaifiyaat Express is a daily Superfast Express train of the Indian Railways, running between Azamgarh, Uttar Pradesh, and Old Delhi, the capital city of India.

The name Kaifiyat tributes to legendary poet late Mr. Kaifi Azmi, who belonged to Azamgarh.

Number & nomenclature
The train numbers of the Kaifiyat Expresses are:

 12225 UP:- From Azamgarh  to Old Delhi – 803 km/14:30 hrs
 12226 DN:- From Old Delhi to Azamgarh – 803 km/14:10 hrs

Route & halts

Coach composition 
The train generally consists of a total number of 22 LHB coach as follows:
 1 AC I Tier
 2 AC II Tier
 6 AC III Tier
 7 Sleeper class
 4 Unreserved
 2 EOG

Locomotive

 WDP-4D:- Azamgarh to Shahganj Junction
 WAP-5 / WAP-7:- Shahganj Junction to Old Delhi
 Loco reversal: Shahganj Junction & Lucknow Junction

See also
 Godaan Express
 Chhapra Express
 Utsarg Express

References
 Mohammad Faisal Nadwi

External links
  India Rail Info
  India Rail Info

Named passenger trains of India
Express trains in India
Transport in Azamgarh
Rail transport in Uttar Pradesh
Rail transport in Delhi